Fire & Smoke is the second studio album by American country music artist Earl Thomas Conley. It was released on October 14, 1981 via RCA Records. The album the singles "Silent Treatment", "Fire and Smoke", "Tell Me Why" and "After the Love Slips Away"

Track listing

Chart performance

References

1981 albums
Earl Thomas Conley albums
RCA Records albums